Autoheart is a London-based indie-pop group formed in 2011, consisting of Jody Gadsden (vocals), Simon Neilson (piano, keys and saxophone), and Barney JC (guitar, bass, keys).

History

The Gadsdens 
Jody Gadsden and Simon Neilson met in 2007 and began working together under the name The Gadsdens after collaborating on a song for a short film soundtrack. The original lineup also featured drummer David Roman and guitarist Drew Wilson, who was later replaced by Barney JC. Their debut single, The Sailor Song, released in 2009, was championed by Bob Harris on his BBC Radio 2 Show and was Single of the Week on Shaun Keaveny’s BBC 6 Music radio show. The single release was accompanied by an animated music video by London-based animator and director Gavin Leisfield.

The Gadsdens appeared on The Radcliffe and Maconie BBC Radio 2 show on 17 November 2009, performing three tracks, The Sailor Song, Too Polite To Fight and Agoraphobia.

Maconie and Radcliffe placed the band’s live version of The Sailor Song on their "Best Live Sessions of 2009" end of year list.  In response to the news that the BBC plan to cut Radcliffe and Maconie’s radio show from four nights a week to three, Marc Lee from The Daily Telegraph mentioned The Gadsdens, commenting "I heard what proved to be my favourite songs of both 2008 and 2009 for the first time on the show – The Last of the Melting Snow by the Leisure Society and The Sailor Song by the Gadsdens, both of them strange and gorgeous".

Q made The Sailor Song their Track of the Day, calling it “a charming and pulsating piece of piano pop that holds no surprises, tempo shifts or digital tweaks, it’s naturally sentimental, sending strong links to Tracy Chapman, mostly due to the vocal style of frontman Jody Gadsden”.

The band received praise from MTV and were featured in The Guardians "The Measure" as one to watch.

 Autoheart 

The Gadsdens announced on 24 August 2011 they had "evolved" and were to be known going forward as Autoheart''', a name derived from a lyric in The Sailor Song. On the same day, they posted a cover recording of "Ordinary Fool" on YouTube. The song was originally included on the Bugsy Malone soundtrack.

The band released a cover of Joni Mitchell's River at Christmas 2012. 

The band were featured as The Guardian's New Band of the Day on 9 July 2013.  Gadsden's vocal style was likened to that of Anohni and Andy Bell.

 Punch (2013) 
Autoheart's debut album Punch was released on 15 July 2013 on O/R Records. The lineup included bassist Jihea Oh and the album was produced by Danton Supple. The album's artwork was created by Young & Sick, a friend of the band. It was preceded by three singles: Control (5 November 2012), Lent (11 February 2013), and a double A-side single Moscow / Agoraphobia (8 July 2013). The band released a final single, Beat the Love (28 January 2014), which did not feature on the album. 

A video for Moscow, directed by Gavin Leisfield, featured kissing Russian soldiers which the band said was to show "support and love to the LGBT communities of Russia and their friends, who are faced daily with violence and the criminalisation of love and of freedom of expression". The band also released self-directed videos for Agoraphobia and Beat The Love.

 I Can Build A Fire (2016) 
The band's second album, the self-produced I Can Build A Fire was released 26 August 2016. The lineup for the album included Berlin-based singer Anne Haight, who provided additional vocals on tracks Oxford Blood, We Can Build a Fire, and Joseph. 

The video for the album's lead single Oxford Blood, released the same month, was directed by Prano Bailey-Bond, and starred American gender non-conforming model, actor and activist Rain Dove. 

In June 2017, the band released an EP titled My Hallelujah featuring the title track, taken from the album along with three new songs. The video for My Hallelujah was directed by queer drag performer, artist and moving image creator Joseph Wilson.

 Punch - Special Edition (2017) 
In 2017, the band released Punch - Special Edition featuring home demo versions of album tracks, including an early demo of The Sailor Song. 

On 27 December 2019 the band released the single Wretch. A video of the band performing the song live, directed by percussionist and film-maker Ruairi Glasheen, was released at the same time.

 Hellbent (2021) 
Their third album Hellbent was released on October 29, 2021, with the single I Know That He Loves Me out two weeks prior. The official video for the song was directed by Joseph Wilson, starring Italian, London based actor Claudio La Mattina. 

On the day the album was released, an animated video for the title track Hellbent (collaboration with the singer Keziah of the band Black Gold Buffalo) was released, made by the artist AspenTart, who is also responsible for the album art. 

On 9 September 2022, the band released the Time Machine EP featuring new tracks Scorpio, If Only In The Night and London In July with artwork from AspenTart. The Time Machine music video was directed by Siri Rodnes and starred Bailey Easton and Cavan Malone.

Discography
 Singles & EPs 
 The Sailor Song (30 November 2009)
 Control (5 November 2012)
 Lent including Foolishly Wrong and Stalker's Tango as B-Sides (11 February 2013)
 Moscow / Agoraphobia (8 July 2013)
 Beat The Love (14 February 2014)
 Possibility (22 July 2016)
 Oxford Blood (19 August 2016)
 My Hallelujah EP including Tucson, Robbing Banks and No Beat To My Heart (23 June 2017)
 Hungover in the City of Dust (Acoustic) (18 February 2019)
 Wretch (27 December 2019)
 I Know That He Loves Me (15 October 2021)
 Time Machine EP including Scorpio, If Only In The Night and London In July (9 September 2022)

 Albums 
 Punch (2013)
 Demos (2014) - Bandcamp only release
 I Can Build A Fire (2016)
 Punch - Special Edition - (2017)
 Hellbent'' (2021)

External Links 

 Official Website

References

Musical groups established in 2007
Musical groups from London